The Beloved Vagabond may refer to:

 The Beloved Vagabond (novel), a 1906 British novel by William John Locke
 The Beloved Vagabond (play), a 1908 play adapted from the novel
 The Beloved Vagabond (1915 film), an American film
 The Beloved Vagabond (1923 film), a British film
 The Beloved Vagabond (1936 film), a British film